HNoMS Odin was a  that entered service with the Royal Norwegian Navy in 1939. She and the other Sleipner-class vessels were built as part of a Norwegian rearmament scheme in the last years leading up to the Second World War. In 1940, she had taken part in protecting Norwegian neutrality, before being caught in the German invasion of Norway on 9 April 1940. After fighting the invasion forces at Kristiansand, she was captured and pressed into Kriegsmarine service for the duration of the war. After the end of the war, she was returned to Norway. In 1948, she and her surviving sister ships were converted to frigates and remained in service until sold for scrapping in 1959.

Construction
Odin was built at Karljohansvern naval shipyard in Horten with yard number 126, and was launched on 24 January 1939.

Second World War
After the outbreak of the Second World War, Odin formed part of the 3rd destroyer section in the Kristiansand Defence Sector of the 1st Naval District.

Opposing the German invasion of Norway

Rio de Janeiro
On 8 April 1940, she had taken part together with the guard ship Lyngdal in the rescue of the surviving sailors and soldiers from the 5,199 ton clandestine German troop transport  sunk by the Polish submarine  near the small port of Lillesand.

Defending Kristiansand
The next morning, 9 April 1940, Odin took part in the defence of Kristiansand, against landing group four of the German invasion of Norway. When the battle at Kristiansand between the Kriegsmarine flotilla and Odderøya Fort began Odin steamed out into the Toppdalsfjord and opened up on attacking Luftwaffe bombers with her Oerlikon 20 mm cannon and two 12.7 mm anti-aircraft machine guns. Continuous evasive manoeuvring saved the destroyer from being hit by the many bombs dropped at her and several hits were recorded on the attacking aircraft. One of Heinkel He 111s fell to the sea while returning home with engine malfunction, probably due to the Odin's fire. At about 07:30 a twin-engined aircraft attacked the interned  that was docked in Kristiansand harbour, having been seized by Norwegian warships for neutrality violations after running aground on the Oddene shallows near Mandal 27 March that year. U-21 had been docked in Kristiansand since 28 March. Odin fired at the aircraft, only to discover it was a RAF Lockheed Hudson reconnaissance aircraft. Neither this time did the Odin'''s fire bring her target down. At 10:00 an order not to fire at British and French forces came to the commander of Kristiansand. This order, combined with confusion of which flags were flown by the intruding warships, led to the German force being able to enter the harbour unopposed on their third attempt at 10:30. Odin was captured at Marvika naval station together with numerous other naval vessels in the Kristiansand area, including her sister ship .HNoMS Odin Krigsseilerregisteret 

German service as Panther
After the German capture of Kristiansand Odin was handed over to the Kriegsmarine on 11 April and officially entered service as Panther on 20 April. However, before entering the Kriegsmarine she was partially rebuilt and rearmed. During the remainder of the war she operated in Skagerrak and Kattegat as an escort and training ship, in 1940 forming the 7. Torpedobootsflottille together with Gyller, and from January 1942 as a torpedo recovery vessel in Gotenhafen.

In German service she was fitted to carry 24 mines. Since 1941, her armament was changed to one 10.5 cm gun at the stern, one 3.7 cm anti-aircraft gun and four 2 cm anti aircraft guns, without torpedo tubes.

Post-war RNoN service
After the end of the Second World War Panther/Odin was recovered in Holmestrand, Norway, May 1945 and returned to the Royal Norwegian Navy. After three more years in Norway as a destroyer Odin was converted to a frigate in 1948. Odin'' and her sister ships was phased out and sold for scrapping in 1959

Notes

Bibliography
 
 
 
 
 

Naval ships of Norway captured by Germany during World War II
Ships built in Horten
Sleipner-class destroyers
World War II destroyers of Norway
Frigates of the Royal Norwegian Navy
1939 ships